Ampelonas is a village and a municipal unit of the Tyrnavos municipality. Before the 2011 local government reform it was an independent municipality. The 2011 census recorded 6,083 inhabitants in the village and 8,055 inhabitants in the municipal unit. The community of Ampelonas covers an area of 38.632 km2 while the respective municipal unit covers an area of  154.759 km2.

Administrative division
The municipali unit of Ampelonas consists of four communities:
 Ampelonas (population 6,083)
 Deleria (population 655)
 Rodia (population 732)
 Vryotopos (population 585)

History
Ampelonas was founded in the first quarter of the 15th century, when the Ottoman sultan Murad II settled 5,000–6,000 Yörüks from Konya in the area of Ampelonas. Following the 1881 Convention of Constantinople and the cession of Thessaly to Greece, the Turks of the village sold their properties and immigrated to Asia Minor, while Greeks moved in the area. Until 1928 the village was named Kazaklar.

Economy
Ampelonas is a rural area and its main products are grapes, wine and tsipouro. Ampelonas Wine Festival is held annually in the village since 1959. Cotton, cereals, corn, almonds, pears and peaches are grown in the area. Moreover, there are cultivations of fruits and  vegetables like cabbages, peppers, tomatoes, melons and watermelons.

Population
According to the 2011 census, the population of the settlement of Ampelonas was 6,083 people, an increase of almost 1.5% compared with the population of the previous census of 2001.

See also
 List of settlements in the Larissa regional unit

References

Populated places established in the 15th century
Tyrnavos
Populated places in Larissa (regional unit)